Dikchu is a small town in the Gangtok District of the Indian state of Sikkim. The town lies at the confluence of the Dikchu River with the Teesta River and is the site of the 96 MW Dikchu River Hydroelectric Power Project as well as 510 MW Teesta V Hydroelectric Power Project. Dikchu is the last town of Gangtok District that lies on the North Sikkim Highway connecting Singtam to Chungthang, after crossing the town we enter Mangan District. Small market north of river Dikchu also lies on Mangan District.

Transport 
The town is well connected to many parts of Sikkim and its neighbouring state West Bengal. Taxi services access Gangtok, Mangan, Chungthang,  Singtam,  Rangpo, Makha, Ranipool, Lachen, Lachung  and Siliguri.

The nearest airport is Pakyong Airport 59 kilometres away. 
The nearest railway stations are:
 Sevoke Junction 97 kilometres.
 Siliguri Junction 116 kilometres.
 New Jalpaiguri  122 kilometres.

Rangpo railway station is an under construction station 42 kilometres away from the town.

Geography

Climate

It has a humid subtropical type of climate ranging from 2 °C in winter to 30 °C in summer. It is normally dry in winter but rainfall occurs all year round. Monsoon season starts during the second week of June till September which is charectorised by heavy rainfall, landslides and dense fog can disrupt travel during this days. Average rainfall in a year ranges from 2800mm- 3000mm. Best time to visit here is during spring and autumn season when plenty of sunshine is available making it a pleasurable day but Violent afternoon thunderstorms are common during afternoon hours in pre monsoon(spring) and post monsoon(autumn) season with strong surface winds,hailstorms and heavy rainfall it is always advisable to look at weather forecast before planning such trips.

Banking Facilities
State Bank of India presently has one branch in Dikchu town in Sikkim.

State Bank Of India, Dikchu

See also
Gangtok District
Teesta
Pakyong Airport

References

Cities and towns in Gangtok district
Cities and towns in Mangan district
Gangtok District